The 1999 Pacific Curling Championships were held from December 9 to 12 in Tokoro, Hokkaido, Japan. 

Japan won the men's event over Australia (it was the first Pacific title for the Japanese men). On the women's side, Japan defeated South Korea in the final (it was the eighth Pacific title for the Japanese women).   

By virtue of winning, the Japanese men's team and the Japanese women's team qualified for the 2000 World  and  Curling Championships in Glasgow, Scotland.

Men

Teams

Round robin

 Teams to playoffs

Playoffs

Semifinal

Final

Final standings

Women

Teams

Round robin

 Teams to playoffs

Playoffs

Final standings

References

External links

Pacific Curling Championships, 1999
Pacific-Asia Curling Championships
International curling competitions hosted by Japan
1999 in Japanese sport
Sport in Hokkaido
December 1999 sports events in Asia